Clearwater County may refer to:

 Clearwater County, Alberta, Canada
 Clearwater County, Idaho, United States
 Clearwater County, Minnesota, United States
 USS Clearwater County (LST-602), a United States Navy tank landing ship